Merion Mercy Academy is a female Catholic, college preparatory school, teaching grades 9 through 12, sponsored by the Sisters of Mercy located in Merion, Pennsylvania, just outside Philadelphia. It is an independent school located in the Archdiocese of Philadelphia and was previously known as the "Mater Misericordiae Academy" prior to 1968.

History
Significant changes have taken place from 1987 to the present. Recent events include the merger of the lower school with Waldron Academy for Boys next door in 1987, thereby giving the entire  Merion Mercy building, built in 1954, to the education of high school girls. The new grade school was named Waldron Mercy Academy. 
Academically, the school earned a Blue Ribbon School of Excellence Award in 1996 as recognition from the United States Department of Education.

A  addition to the MMA building in 2003 added a new chapel, administrative offices,  classrooms and meeting rooms, new athletic facilities, and a study center for students. Some other significant renovations took place in the summer of 2004. The school's principal since 2007 is Sister Barbara Buckley, who is also an alumna. Recently, Merion-Mercy won the 92.5 WXTU radio station contest in each of two consecutive years.  On December 19, 2007, country artist Kellie Pickler performed for the student body, and on December 2, 2008, Dancing with the Stars' winner Julianna Hough performed on the school's stage.

Athletics
Merion Mercy joined the Pennsylvania Interscholastic Athletic Association (PIAA) in 1994 for scholastic athletic competition. The very next year the basketball team won the state PIAA Class AA championship. Continuing their success, the track and field team won the PIAA state championship in 1998 and in 2001, and the volleyball team won the PIAA state championship in 2001 and 2003. The volleyball team earned back-to-back-to-back-to-back state championships in 2007, 2008, 2009 and 2010. The crew team won the Groton Cup at the Henley Regatta in 2011 and both the Freshmen 8 and Varsity 4 won Stotesbury in 2012. The building houses the Patricia Waldron Fitness Center.

Notable alumnae
Patricia McGuire, president, Trinity Washington University
Alyse Wojciechowski (Alyse Alan Louis) currently stars on Broadway's "Mamma Mia" as bride-to-be Sophie Sheridan
Gianna Yanelli, on Broadway in Mean Girls the Musical 
Patricia Carbine, co-founder, editor, and publisher, Ms. (magazine)

Notes and references

External links
The Merion Mercy Academy
@ Private School Review
Search Committee Posting

Catholic secondary schools in Pennsylvania
Girls' schools in Pennsylvania
Educational institutions established in 1884
Schools in Montgomery County, Pennsylvania
Sisters of Mercy schools
1884 establishments in Pennsylvania